Cormac Burke may refer to:

 Cormac Burke (footballer), (born 1993) is a Northern Irish association footballer
 Cormac Burke (priest)